Képespuszta (Hungary) is a village in Baranya county, near Orfű, Pécs.

External links 
 Europe, Hungary 

Populated places in Baranya County